Columbiaville is a village in Lapeer County in the U.S. state of Michigan. The population was 787 at the 2010 census. The village is within Marathon Township on the Flint River.

History
The first settler on the site of the village was Levi D. Cutting, a carpenter and cabinet maker by trade, who arrived with his family in 1847. His home in Columbiaville is still standing at the south corner of Water and Lapeer Streets. In 1848, George and Henry Niver built a saw mill on the banks of the Flint River and the place became known as "Niverville".  William Peter, a neighbor of the Nivers from their previous residence in Columbia County, New York came to work in the Niver's sawmill. By 1852, he opened his own business, starting with a store. He eventually came into possession of the entire property of Columbiaville.

A post office was established in April 1857 with the name "Columbiaville". The Nivers originally suggested the name "Columbia" after their home county in New York, but at the time there was already another post office in Michigan with that name.

The village continued to grow with the inclusion of a large Steam Grist and Flouring Mill, built by William Peter. The Detroit and Bay City Railroad chose to route through Columbiaville and was opened to the public in 1872. The first depot was a wooden structure located on the east side of the track at Pine Street. In 1893 the brick depot was erected by William Peter, with the provision in the deed that all passenger trains were to stop in Columbiaville. The railroad provided great means of transportation and opportunity for the village. In 1892 the Peters along with Toledo workmen, built the William Peter Mansion. They moved into the sixteen room Mansion in 1896. Mrs. Peter stated that the location of the home was chosen for convenience of being right downtown in the center of activity. Peter soon after became ill and died on October 23, 1899, at age 75. He is buried at Woodlawn Cemetery. The first automobile traveled into the village in 1903, and was not initially well accepted by all residents who were in fear of witch craft. The first gas station in the village was established in the early 1900s by  Standard Oil Company. Early automobile dealers were Roy Osborne, who built a large garage and dealership display on Water Street in 1920. Thomas Ward established Willey's Overland Garage in the 1920s.

Geography

Demographics

2010 census
As of the census of 2010, there were 787 people, 299 households, and 207 families residing in the village. The racial makeup of the village was 95.2% White, 0.4% Native American, 0.1% Asian, 2.5% from other races, and 1.8% from two or more races. Hispanic or Latino of any race were 4.6% of the population.

There were 299 households, of which 35.5% had children under the age of 18 living with them, 48.5% were married couples living together, 13.4% had a female householder with no husband present, 7.4% had a male householder with no wife present, and 30.8% were non-families. 27.1% of all households were made up of individuals, and 13% had someone living alone who was 65 years of age or older. The average household size was 2.63 and the average family size was 3.18.

The median age in the village was 36.4 years. 27.1% of residents were under the age of 18; 9.2% were between the ages of 18 and 24; 25.7% were from 25 to 44; 26.1% were from 45 to 64; and 11.9% were 65 years of age or older. The gender makeup of the village was 47.8% male and 52.2% female.

2000 census
As of the census of 2000, there were 815 people, 304 households, and 216 families residing in the village. The racial makeup of the village was 96.07% White, 0.25% African American, 0.49% Native American, 0.74% Asian, 1.23% from other races, and 1.23% from two or more races. Hispanic or Latino of any race were 1.60% of the population.

There were 304 households, out of which 36.8% had children under the age of 18 living with them, 53.9% were married couples living together, 14.1% had a female householder with no husband present, and 28.9% were non-families. 24.3% of all households were made up of individuals, and 10.2% had someone living alone who was 65 years of age or older.  The average household size was 2.68 and the average family size was 3.20.

In the village, the population was spread out, with 28.0% under the age of 18, 8.7% from 18 to 24, 33.1% from 25 to 44, 19.5% from 45 to 64, and 10.7% who were 65 years of age or older.  The median age was 33 years. For every 100 females, there were 91.3 males.  For every 100 females age 18 and over, there were 85.8 males.

The median income for a household in the village was $39,844, and the median income for a family was $45,750. Males had a median income of $40,156 versus $20,000 for females. The per capita income for the village was $16,216.  About 3.2% of families and 4.3% of the population were below the poverty line, including 2.7% of those under age 18 and 4.2% of those age 65 or over.

References

External links
Columbiaville.org

Villages in Lapeer County, Michigan
Villages in Michigan
Populated places established in 1847
1847 establishments in Michigan